These are the official results of the 2018 Ibero-American Championships in Athletics which took place on August 24, 25 and 26, 2018, in Trujillo, Peru.

Men's results

100 meters

Heats – August 24Wind:Heat 1: +0.5 m/s, Heat 2: -0.4 m/s

Final – August 24Wind:+0.7 m/s

200 meters

Heats – August 25Wind:Heat 1: -0.2 m/s, Heat 2: -0.2 m/s

Final – August 26Wind:+0.7 m/s

400 meters
August 25

800 meters
August 26

1500 meters
August 25

3000 meters
August 26

5000 meters
August 24

110 meters hurdles
August 25Wind: -0.2 m/s

400 meters hurdles

Heats – August 25

Final – August 26

3000 meters steeplechase
August 25

4 × 100 meters relay
August 25

4 × 400 meters relay
August 26

20,000 meters walk
August 26

High jump
August 24

Pole vault
August 24

Long jump
August 25

Triple jump
August 26

Shot put
August 25

Discus throw
August 25

Hammer throw
August 24

Javelin throw
August 25

Decathlon
August 24–25

Women's results

100 meters

Heats – August 24Wind:Heat 1: +1.3 m/s, Heat 2: +0.5 m/s

Final – August 24Wind:+1.1 m/s

200 meters
August 26Wind: +0.3 m/s

400 meters

Heats – August 24

Final – August 25

800 meters
August 26

1500 meters
August 25

3000 meters
August 26

5000 meters
August 24

100 meters hurdles
August 25Wind: -0.2 m/s

400 meters hurdles
August 25

3000 meters steeplechase
August 25

4 × 100 meters relay
August 25

4 × 400 meters relay
August 26

10,000 meters walk
August 25

High jump
August 25

Pole vault
August 25

Long jump
August 24

Triple jump
August 25

Shot put
August 26

Discus throw
August 24

Hammer throw
August 25

Javelin throw
August 26

Heptathlon
August 25–26

References

Ibero-American Championships Results
Events at the Ibero-American Championships in Athletics